Therapis is a monotypic moth genus in the family Geometridae first described by Jacob Hübner in 1823. Its only species, Therapis flavicaria, was first described by Michael Denis and Ignaz Schiffermüller in 1775. It is found in south-eastern and eastern Europe, east to Turkey, Russia and Georgia.

The wingspan is 26–30 mm.

The larvae feed on various Lamiaceae species, including Lamium and Galeopsis.

References

"Therapis flavicaria (Denis & Schiffermüller, 1775)". Fauna Europaea. Retrieved April 8, 2019.
"07618 Therapis flavicaria ([Denis & Schiffermüller], 1775)". Lepiforum e.V. Retrieved April 8, 2019.

Ourapterygini
Moths of Europe
Moths of Asia
Monotypic moth genera